Lincoln Southeast High School is a public  government education school located in Lincoln, Nebraska, United States.  It is part of the Lincoln Public Schools school district.

Lincoln Southeast High School has the highest accreditation from the Nebraska Department of Education. It is a member of, and is accredited by, the North Central Association of Colleges and Secondary Schools. In 1986, Southeast High School was recognized in the U.S. Department of Education's Secondary School Recognition Program as a "School of Excellence". The school colors are black, gold, and white, and its athletic teams are the Knights.  Advanced Placement courses are offered for freshmen, sophomores, juniors, and seniors.

Renovations
As part of a recent $250 million school improvement bond issue, renovations were planned for Southeast and are now finished. Renovations included the expansion of the cafeteria, the replacement of the roofing and windows, renovation of the performing arts wing, new classroom additions, new heating and air conditioning systems, and various exterior fixes. The renovations were started in June 2006 and were expected to be finished in mid-2008, but delays moved it back to early 2009.

Extracurricular activities

Athletics
From 1971 until 2013, Southeast was nominated for twenty All Sport Championships. From its beginning in 1955, Southeast has won 114 state championships for team sports in various athletic fields.

Non-athletic programs
Southeast offers many other non-athletic programs, such as drama, speech, and debate. Southeast's dance team, the Shirettes, have won national competitions since their inception in the 1980s, including in 2015. Southeast's cheerleading competition team won the state title in 2010 and 2016.

Music

Southeast also has a music program that includes three symphonic bands, marching band, three jazz bands and eight choirs that compete in numerous state festivals.

The Nebraska Cornhusker Marching Band was unable to attend the Holiday Bowl, and the Lincoln Southeast Marching Knights were asked to fill in at the bowl game. They played for the Nebraska Cornhuskers football team as they took the field on December 30, 2009 and performed during the game.

The Lincoln Southeast Marching Knights will be performing at the halftime show of the 2019 Valero Alamo Bowl in a mass band.

Notable alumni

 Mirsad Bektić, mixed martial artist fighting in the Ultimate Fighting Championship
 Jon Bruning, 31st Attorney General of Nebraska
 Bob Green, American college football coach
Trent Claus, visual effects artist
 Chris Cooper, former NFL player
 Ana Marie Cox, founding editor of Wonkette
 Deb Fischer, senior United States senator from Nebraska
 Luke Gifford, NFL player
 Alex Gordon, outfielder for the Kansas City Royals
 Jon Hesse, former NFL player
 Joshua James, folk singer
 Paige Nielsen, professional soccer player
 Nathan Phillips, a Native American political activist
 Emily Poeschl, Miss Nebraska USA 2006
 Andrea Portes, bestselling novelist
 Barrett Ruud, former NFL linebacker for the Tampa Bay Buccaneers
 Bo Ruud, former NFL player
 Erik Sommer, artist
 Ryland Steen, drummer for Reel Big Fish
 Carel Stith, former NFL player
 Matthew Sweet, musician, songwriter, and singer
 James Valentine, guitarist for Maroon 5

References

External links
 LSE homepage

Public high schools in Nebraska
Schools in Lincoln, Nebraska